Gordon S. Earle (born February 27, 1943) is a Canadian politician. Earle is a member of the New Democratic Party and a former member of the House of Commons of Canada, representing the riding of Halifax West from 1997 to 2000.  Earle is the first black Member of Parliament elected from Nova Scotia.

Career 
Earle was a senior public servant, he was the first employee of the Nova Scotia Human Rights Commission. He served as Chief Human Rights Officer and assistant to the Ombudsman in Nova Scotia and as Ombudsman of Manitoba.

While in Parliament, Earle was the NDP critic of Multiculturalism, Citizenship and Immigration, Indian Affairs and Northern Development, National Defence, and Veterans Affairs. Earle lost his seat in the 2000 Canadian federal election.

In the 2004 federal election, Earle ran in the riding of South Shore—St. Margaret's, in which a small part of the old Halifax West, in which he resided, had been moved under redistricting.  He was defeated by the incumbent, Conservative Gerald Keddy, coming third. He ran again in the 2006 federal election, again losing to Keddy, but improving his vote total and placing second. Earle ran against Keddy for a third time in the 2008 federal election, losing by less than one thousand votes.

Earle again contested the riding in the 2011 federal election losing to Keddy.

Personal life 
Earle is a martial artist with a black belt in Karate.  He founded the Hammonds Plains Karate Club.

Electoral record

See also 
 Black Nova Scotians

References 

1943 births
Living people
Members of the House of Commons of Canada from Nova Scotia
New Democratic Party MPs
Ombudsmen in Canada
Black Nova Scotians
People from Halifax, Nova Scotia
Black Canadian politicians